Epepeotes fimbriatus is a species of flat-faced longhorns beetle belonging to the family Cerambycidae, subfamily Lamiinae.

Description

Distribution
This species can be found in Indonesia (Moluccas).

References
 Biolib
 Global Names

fimbriatus
Beetles described in 1792